Editora JBC (also known as "JBC") is a company that publishes books (including manga) and magazines related to Japan in Brazil. It has its headquarters in São Paulo.

This company was established in Tokyo, Japan, in 1992 to publish Portuguese newspapers for Brazilians who live in Japan. And it came to publish books and magazines related to Japan also in Brazil. Now this publisher is also known as a manga publisher in Brazil. Since 2006, the company supports the World Cosplay Summit (WCS), an annual international cosplay event, and hosts the preliminary rounds in Brazil.

JBC is more well known in Brazil than in Japan, although it is a Japanese company.

Name
The meaning of the name JBC of the company is Japan Brazil Communication.

The formal name of the company is JB Communication ("JBC出版社" in Japan), the name of the branch office in Brazil is JB Communication do Brasil Ltda. In the publication, being described only as JBC is usual.

Publication

In Japan
Tudo Bem - The newspaper written in Portuguese for the Brazilians in Japan. Started in 1993. 
Gambare! - The free magazine written in Portuguese for the Brazilians in Japan. Started in September 2005.

In Brazil
Made in Japan - The monthly magazine that introduces various things of Japan. Started in September 1997.

And JBC publishes manga and books related to Japan only in Brazil.

Manga

This company entered the publication of manga in 2001 with Samurai X (Rurouni Kenshin). JBC is generally known as a publisher of manga and the second biggest manga publisher in Brazil now. The manga of these Portuguese editions is sold only in Brazil.

The catchphrase is "Mangá é a nossa língua!" (Manga is our language!).

Manga published by JBC in Portuguese in Brazil

2001

2002

2003

2004

2005

2006

2007
Jan. Fullmetal Alchemist
Apr. Samurai Girl
May. Inu-Neko *R18
Jun. Gravitation
Jun. Death Note
Sep. Saint Seiya: The Lost Canvas ("Os Cavaleiros do Zodiaco - The Lost Canvas: A Saga de Hades" in Brazil)
Sep. Socrates in Love

2008
Jan. Hunter × Hunter
May. Revolutionary Girl Utena
Jun. Please Twins! ("Onegai Twins" in Brazil and the Japanese versions)
Jul. Nana
Jul. Hellsing

2009
Jan. Tenjho Tenge
Feb. Futari Ecchi
May. Full Moon o Sagashite
Jul. Dna²
Sep. Ranma ½

2010
Jan. Hikaru no Go
Jan. Golgo 13
Mar. Blue Dragon - Ral Ω Grad
Apr. D•N•Angel
Jun. Miyuki-chan in Wonderland ("Miyuki-chan no País das Maravilhas" in Brazil)
Jul. Rosario+Vampire
Jul. Blue Dragon: Secret Trick
Jul. Buso Renkin
Ago. MÄR
Ago. Town of Evening Calm, Country of Cherry Blossoms ("Hiroshima - a Cidade da Calmaria " in Brazil)
Set. Monster Hunter Orage
Set. Neon Genesis Evangelion
Oct. Fairy Tail

2011
Jan. Code Geass: Lelouch of the Rebellion ("Code Geass - A rebelião de Lelouch" in Brazil)
Feb. Summer Wars
Mar. Ga-rei
Apr. Saber Marionette J
Jul. Death Note - Another Note
Ago. Bakuman
Set. Saint Seiya: Next Dimension
Set. Code Geass: Suzaku of the Counterattack ("Code Geass - O Contra-ataque de Suzaku" in Brazil)
Set. Death Note - L Change the World
Oct. Neon Genesis Evangelion - Tankōbon Version
Oct. Rosario + Vampire: Season II
Nov. Kobato
Nov. Code Geass: Nightmare of Nunnally ("Code Geass - O Pesadelo de Nunnally" in Brazil)

2012
Jan. Saint Seiya - Tankōbon Version
Mar. Hero Tales
Jun. Freezing
Jun. Cardcaptor Sakura - Tankōbon Version ("Sakura Card Captors" in Brazil )
Jul. Soul Eater
Ago. Saint Seiya: The Lost Canvas – Anecdotes ("Os Cavaleiros do Zodíaco - The Lost Canvas: Gaiden" in Brazil)
Set. Mashima-En
Oct. RG Veda
Oct. Nurarihyon no Mago ("Nura-A Ascensão do Clã das Sombras" in Brazil)
Nov. Rurouni Kenshin - Tankōbon Version

2013
Jan. Future Diary ("Diário do Futuro" in Brazil)
Feb. Burn-Up: Excess & W
Feb. Another
Mar. Level E
Apr. Love Hina
May. The Innocent
Jun. Death Note - Black Edition
Jun. Genshiken
Jun. King of Thorn ("Senhor dos Espinhos" in Brazil) 
Jul. Blue Exorcist
Ago. Thermae Romae
Oct. Inazuma Eleven ("Super Onze" in Brazil)
Oct. Magic Knight Rayearth ("Guerreiras mágicas de Rayearth" in Brazil) - Tankōbon Version
Dec. Ōsama Game ("Jogo do rei" in Brazil)
Dec. Manga of the dead

2014
Feb. Btooom!
Mar. Future Diary - Mosaic ("Diário do Futuro: Mosaic" in Brazil)
Apr. Future Diary - Paradox ("Diário do Futuro: Paradox" in Brazil)
Apr. Sailor Moon
May. Yokokuhan ("Prophecy" in Brazil)
Jun. The Lucifer and Biscuit Hammer ("Lúcifer e o martelo" in Brazil)
Jul. Tsumitsuki ("Tsumitsuki - Espírito da culpa" in Brazil)
Jul. Magi: The Labyrinth of Magic ("Magi: O labirinto da magia" in Brazil)
Sep. Doubt
Sep. Hoshi Mamoru Inu ("O cão que guarda as estrelas" in Brazil)
Oct. Chikyuu no Houkago ("After School of the Earth" in Brazil)
Oct. Tom Sawyer
Oct. YuYu Hakusho - Tankōbon Version
Nov. Calling You ("Só você pode ouvir" in Brazil)
Nov. Soul Eater Not!
Dec. All You Need Is Kill

2015
Jan. Green Blood
Fev. Kizu ("Feridas" in Brazil)
Fev. Blast of Tempest ("Zetsuen no Tempest ~ O Destruidor da Civilização ~" in Brazil)
Fev. Jigokuren: Love in the Hell ("Love in the Hell" in Brazil)
Fev. Ageha ("Ageha - Efeito Borboleta" in Brazil)
Mar. The Seven Deadly Sins ("The Seven Deadly Sins" in Brazil)
Apr. Enigma (Announced)
Apr. Steins;Gate (Announced)
Apr. Sailor Moon - Short Stories (Announced)
Apr. Eien no Zero ("Zero Eterno" in Brazil) (Announced)
May. Chobits - Tankōbon Version (Announced)
Jun. Codename: Sailor V (Announced)
Wish (Announced)
Vitamin (Announced)
Ghost in the Shell (Announced)
Eden: It's an Endless World! (Announced)
Terra Formars (Announced)
Kill la Kill (Announced) ("Ink" Stamp)
Another (novel) (Announced)
Zoku Hoshi Mamoru Inu (Announced)
Zetman (Announced)
Dec. Akira (Announced)

References

External links
Editora JBC
Mangás JBC

Jbc
Jbc
Magazine publishing companies of Japan
Magazine publishing companies of Brazil
Comic book publishing companies of Brazil
Manga distributors
Publishing companies established in 1992
Mass media in São Paulo
1992 establishments in Brazil